Andrew Eugene Sseppuya (born 1 April 1983) is a Ugandan football striker. Sseppuya is a former international for the Uganda national team.

Biography
Sseppuya played college soccer at Alabama A&M from 2001 to 2004, during which time he played in 59 games, scoring 41 goals and 19 assists, leading the team in scoring from 2001 to 2003. An injury that kept him out for much of the 2004 season prevented him from repeating the feat a fourth season, but despite playing only four games all season, Sepuya was selected 31st in the 2005 MLS Supplemental Draft. He played one game for the Colorado Rapids, before getting his release in June.

Sseppuya has completed a transfer to Armenian soccer team FC Banants for an undisclosed fee. After few league rounds of 2007 season, he was released without making any league appearances. Then he joined Serbian team FK Vojvodina. During winter 2008–09 transfer window, he joined FK Čukarički. In late April 2009, he was statistically the most productive scorer in Serbian Superliga 2008–09 season, having played one match for Vojvodina and 11 for Čukarički while scoring seven goals, all of which translates to a rate of one goal for every 114 minutes on the pitch.

In October 2009, he signed a one-year contract for FK Mladi Radnik. On 16 March 2010, Sseppuya signed a contract with Lithuanian club FK Sūduva. On 1 August 2010, Sseppuya signed a contract with A-League side North Queensland Fury making him the club's 20th player to sign for the upcoming season. Sseppuya scored his first goal for the Fury in their round 3, 2–2 draw with Melbourne Victory. He was released from the Fury after the club folded.

At the end of March 2011, he signed a contract with the Romanian Liga II club Petrolul Ploiești. He was released from the club in the summer, after the club gained promotion into Liga I. In early September 2011 he moved back to Serbia and signed a 2-year contract with FK Borac Čačak. He will be available for the club in the round 5 of the 2011–12 Serbian SuperLiga.

In July 2012, after the relegation of Borac from the SuperLiga, Sseppuya was in trial with Boyacá Chico, although finally he was signed by FK Jedinstvo Bijelo Polje in the Montenegrin First League.

Sseppuya scored 3 goals in 4 appearances for FC Istiklol before being released by the club in January 2014.

References

External links
 
 
 

1983 births
Living people
Sportspeople from Kampala
Ugandan footballers
Ugandan expatriate sportspeople in Australia
Alabama A&M Bulldogs men's soccer players
Association football forwards
Uganda international footballers
Colorado Rapids players
Virginia Beach Mariners players
FC Urartu players
FK Vojvodina players
FK Čukarički players
FK Mladi Radnik players
FK Borac Čačak players
Serbian SuperLiga players
Ugandan expatriate sportspeople in the United States
Expatriate soccer players in the United States
Ugandan expatriate sportspeople in Armenia
Expatriate footballers in Armenia
Ugandan expatriate sportspeople in Serbia
Expatriate footballers in Serbia
Ugandan expatriate sportspeople in Tajikistan
Expatriate footballers in Tajikistan
SC Villa players
FC Petrolul Ploiești players
Northern Fury FC players
Ugandan expatriate sportspeople in Romania
Expatriate footballers in Romania
A-League Men players
FK Jedinstvo Bijelo Polje players
Ugandan expatriate sportspeople in Montenegro
Expatriate footballers in Montenegro
Colorado Rapids draft picks
A-League (1995–2004) players
FC Istiklol players
Major League Soccer players
Tajikistan Higher League players